The Sonata in B minor, Op. 27 is the only sonata written by Swedish composer Kurt Atterberg. It can be performed by either a string instrument (violin, viola, cello) or horn with piano.

History
The sonata was completed in 1925. Originally intended for cello (the composer's instrument), it was published in 1930 as a sonata for cello, viola or violin and piano. The cello version was played by Atterberg himself in the early winter of 1925 in the Organ Hall of the Royal Academy of Music. A performance at an ISCM concert followed a few months later.

Structure
The sonata is in 3 traditional movements:
I. Allegro
II. Adagio molto
III. Allegro energico, poco pesante

The broad first movement follows romantic tradition, the second bears influence of Swedish folklore, and the third is a virtuoso finale.

Recordings
(1993) Eszter Perenyi (violin) and Ilona Prunyi — Marco Polo 8.223404
(1993) Imre Magyari (horn) and Ilona Prunyi — Marco Polo 8.223405
(1997) Werner Thomas-Mifune (cello) and  — Koch-Schwann 3-1585-2

References

Compositions by Kurt Atterberg
Atterberg
Atterberg
Atterberg
Atterberg
1925 compositions
1955 compositions
Compositions in B minor